Heracleopolis or Herakleopolis (Herakleópolis) or Herakleiopolis (Ἡρακλειούπολις) may refer to:

 Heracleopolis Magna in Lower Egypt (now a ruin)
 Heracleopolis Parva or Sethroë in Lower Egypt, identified with the site of Tell Belim
 Heracleopolis (Crete), town of ancient Crete
 Heracleopolis, former name of modern Sulusaray
 Heracleopolis (Pontus), town of ancient Pontus